The discography of the South Korean boy group Teen Top consists of two studio albums, one compilation album, seven extended plays, three single albums, twenty-one singles. The group have been in the Korean music business since July 2010, debuting with their single, "Clap".

Albums

Studio albums

Compilation albums

Single albums

Extended plays

Singles

Promotional singles

Other charted songs

Videography

DVDs

Music videos

References

External links
 Official website 

Discographies of South Korean artists
Discography
K-pop music group discographies